ACB statistical leaders are the season by season stats leaders and all-time stats leaders of the top-tier level professional basketball league in Spain, the Liga ACB, and its predecessor, the Liga Nacional Primera División.

Liga Nacional Primera División and Liga ACB Top Scorers by season
In basketball, points are the sum of the score accumulated through free throws or field goals. The ACB's scoring title is awarded to the player with the highest points per game average in a given regular season.

Player nationality set by the player's national team affiliation.

Liga ACB all-time games played leaders
Player nationality set by the player's national team affiliation. In bold, players active during the 2018–19 season.

A.  Counting also games from the old National League, Joan Creus played 778 games.

Liga ACB all-time scoring leaders
Player nationality set by the player's national team affiliation. In bold, players during the 2018–19 ACB season. In gold, players with more than 6,000 points, considered by the ACB as historic players.

Stats through end of 2018–19 season:

Liga ACB all-time rebounding leaders
Player nationality set by the player's national team affiliation. In bold, players active during the 2018–19 ACB season. In gold, players with more than 2,500 rebounds, considered by the ACB as historic players.

Stats through the end of the 2018–19 season:

Liga ACB all-time assists leaders
Player nationality set by the player's national team affiliation. In bold, players active during the 2018–19 ACB season. In gold, players with more than 1,500 assists, considered by the ACB as historic players.

Stats through the end of the 2018–19 season:

Liga ACB all-time steals leaders
Player nationality set by the player's national team affiliation. In bold, players active during the 2018–19 ACB season. In gold, players with more than 750 steals, considered by the ACB as historic players.

Stats through the end of the 2018–19 season:

Liga ACB all-time blocks leaders
Player nationality set by the player's national team affiliation. In bold, players active during the 2018–19 ACB season. In gold, players with more than 600 blocked shots, considered by the ACB as historic players.

Stats through the end of the 2018–19 season:

Liga ACB all-time made 3 point field goal leaders
Player nationality set by the player's national team affiliation. In bold, players active during the 2018–19 ACB season. In gold, players with more than 650 three-pointers, considered by the ACB as historic players.

Stats through the end of the 2018–19 season:

Liga ACB all-time free throw percentage leaders
Stats as of May 8, 2022

References

External links 
 Liga ACB official website 
 Spanish League at Eurobasket.com
 Liga ACB Historical Data 
 Liga ACB at Linguasport.com